Ockenden Manor is located in Cuckfield, West Sussex, England. The building itself dates from 1520 and is operated as a hotel and restaurant by the Historic Sussex Hotels group.

History
Ockenden Manor has been operated by the Historic Sussex Hotels group since 1987. The building itself is a Grade II* listed Elizabethan era country manor, dating from 1520. It won a Michelin star in 2001 under Martin Hadden, who left shortly afterwards to set up his own restaurant called The Priory House. After losing its star the next year, the restaurant regained it in 2004 and kept it until 2016 under chef Stephen Crane.

The restaurant was used as a location in the 2009 series of the BBC Two show Put Your Money Where Your Mouth Is, where chefs Nick Nairn and Aldo Zilli competed against each other using local ingredients.

Staff from the restaurant have been involved in the annual Roux Scholarship. Former head chef Martin Hadden was the winner of the scholarship in 1989, prior to coming to Ockenden Manor. Matthew Tomkinson won the scholarship in 2005 whilst working at the restaurant, and Vincent Fayat in 2006 and Mark Charker in 2012 reached the regional finals of the competition.

As of June 2018 The Food Standards Agency rated the hotel and spa a hygiene rating of 4 out of 5 - Good.

Reception
Harden's restaurant guide states that there have been "over a hundred visits in a decade, and never disappointed". On a scale of one to five, with one being high, it gives Ockenden Manor a score of two for each of food, service and ambience, describing chef Crane's food as "excellent". The restaurant has been awarded three AA Rosettes, meaning that "expectations of the kitchen are high: exact technique, flair and imagination must come through in every dish, and balance and depth of flavour are all-important".

References

External links
Historic Sussex Hotels official website

Hotel spas
Restaurants in Sussex
Michelin Guide starred restaurants in the United Kingdom
Country houses in West Sussex
Grade II* listed buildings in West Sussex